The phrase Big East basketball tournament may refer to:

Big East men's basketball tournament
Big East women's basketball tournament